Charles Morgan Norwood (1825 – 24 April 1891) was an English steam ship owner and Liberal Party politician who sat in the House of Commons from 1865 to 1885.

Morgan was the eldest son of Charles Norwood of Ashford Kent and his wife Catherine Morgan, daughter of Charles Morgan of Archangel Russia. He was a merchant and steam ship owner and was president of the Hull Chamber of Commerce in 1859 and 1860. He was also the first chairman of the Associated Chambers of Commerce of the United Kingdom. He was a Deputy Lieutenant for the East Riding of Yorkshire.

At the 1865 general election Norwood was elected as one of the two Members of Parliament (MPs) for Kingston upon Hull.
He held the seat until 1885, when it was divided under the Redistribution of Seats Act 1885. He stood unsuccessfully for Bradford Central at the 1886 general election as a Liberal Unionist.

Norwood lived at Higham Hall, Woodford, Essex, with a townhouse at 11 Ennismore Gardens, Knightsbridge. He died at the age of 65.

Norwood married Anna Blakeney, daughter of John Henry Blakeney of Castle Blakeney, Galway in 1855.

Works

References

External links

1825 births
1891 deaths
Liberal Party (UK) MPs for English constituencies
UK MPs 1865–1868
UK MPs 1868–1874
UK MPs 1874–1880
UK MPs 1880–1885
Liberal Unionist Party parliamentary candidates